Alexander "Shura" Shihwarg (30 January 1923 - 20 August 2018) was a poet and restaurateur known for his membership of the "Chelsea Set" in London in the 1950s. During the Second World War he fought with the Hong Kong Volunteer Defence Corps and his reminiscences are the subject of an oral history recording at the Imperial War Museum.

References 

1923 births
2018 deaths
British poets
British restaurateurs
20th-century British businesspeople
British expatriates in Hong Kong